The fourth and final season of the animated television series The Boondocks premiered in the United States on Cartoon Network's late night programming block, Adult Swim, on April 21, 2014 with "Pretty Boy Flizzy", and ended with "The New Black" on June 23, 2014 with a total of ten episodes. The season was produced without any involvement from series creator Aaron McGruder. This is the only season produced and animated by the South Korean studio Mir.

Episodes

References

The Boondocks (TV series) seasons
2014 American television seasons
Studio Mir